Lise Girardin (15 February 1921 – 16 October 2010) was a Swiss politician. A member of the Free Democratic Party, she was the first woman to be elected mayor of Geneva and the first woman named to the Council of States.

Biography
Lise Girardin was born on 15 February 1921 in Geneva. She graduated from the University of Geneva and became a teacher. In 1960, the Canton of Geneva granted women the right to vote. Girardin, who already held a lower judgeship, ran for and won the 1961 election to the Grand Council of Geneva. In 1968, she was elected mayor, the first woman to hold that post.

In 1971, Switzerland granted women the right to vote at the federal level. In the 1971 elections later that year, Girardin was elected to the Council of States while 10 others were elected to the  National Council, making them the first women to sit in the Federal Assembly.

Girardin left the Council of States after the 1975 Swiss federal election but remained active in politics. She served one more term as Mayor of Geneva and participated in various referendums. Girardin died on October 16, 2010.

References

External links
Listing at Swiss Parliament website

1921 births
2010 deaths
Women mayors of places in Switzerland
Mayors of Geneva
Members of the Council of States (Switzerland)
20th-century Swiss women politicians
20th-century Swiss politicians
Free Democratic Party of Switzerland politicians